Sankuyo is a small village in North-West District of Botswana. It is located close to Okavango Delta, and it has a primary school. The population of the village was 372 in 2001 census.
It is also the name of an organisation that runs several lodges in the okavango-delta. One of these lodges is Santawani.

References

North-West District (Botswana)
Villages in Botswana